Khawina is a former Pomo settlement in Lake County, California, one of a number of Pomo settlements catalogued by Stephen Powers. It was located at Sulphur Bank, at an elevation of 1362 feet (415 m).

References

Former settlements in Lake County, California
Former Native American populated places in California
Pomo villages